Benthodesmus tenuis, the slender frostfish or ribbon scabbardfish,  is a species of cutlassfish in the family Trichiuridae.

References

Trichiuridae
Taxa named by Albert Günther
Fish described in 1877